The XVI Island Games (also known as the 2015 NatWest Island Games for sponsorship reasons) was held in Jersey, Channel Islands, from 27 June to 3 July 2015. This was the second time that the island has hosted the games, the first being in 1997.

The week long event saw around 3,000 competitors from 24 islands take part in 14 sports. The official mascot of the games was a real life infant silverback gorilla named Indigo who lives at Durrell Wildlife Park in Trinity, Jersey.

Participating islands
24 island entities of the IIGA, from Europe, South Atlantic and the Caribbean area, competed in these Games.

 (Host)
 Menorca

 St. Helena

 Ynys Môn

Sports

Numbers in parentheses indicate the number of medal events contested in each sport.

 Note: Archery and table tennis make their return to the Island Games. However, gymnastics and squash were dropped from these Games.

Medal table

References

External links

Island Games 2015
Results

 
Multi-sport events in the Channel Islands
Island Games
Sports competitions in Jersey
Island Games
Island Games
Island Games
International sports competitions hosted by the Channel Islands
Island Games
Island Games